Broadwoodkelly is a village and civil parish in the West Devon district of Devon, England. According to the 2001 census it had a population of 218.

Much of the church is 15th century, but it has two piscinae 700 years old, an ancient granite baptismal font, an elizabethan table, and a stained-glass window dated 1523.

References

External links

Broadwoodkelly at GENUKI
Broadwoodkelly community page

Villages in Devon